The 19th G7 Summit was held in Tokyo, Japan, on July 7–9, 1993. The venue for the summit meetings was the State Guesthouse in Tokyo, Japan.
 
The Group of Seven (G7) was an unofficial forum which brought together the heads of the richest industrialized countries: France, Germany, Italy, Japan, the United Kingdom, the United States, Canada (since 1976), and the President of the European Commission (starting officially in 1981). The summits were not meant to be linked formally with wider international institutions; and in fact, a mild rebellion against the stiff formality of other international meetings was a part of the genesis of cooperation between France's president Valéry Giscard d'Estaing and West Germany's chancellor Helmut Schmidt as they conceived the first Group of Six (G6) summit in 1975.

Leaders at the summit
The G7 is an unofficial annual forum for the leaders of Canada, the European Commission, France, Germany, Italy, Japan, the United Kingdom and the United States.

The 19th G7 summit was the first summit for US President Bill Clinton and the last summit for Japanese Prime Minister Kiichi Miyazawa. It was also the first and only summit for Canadian Prime Minister Kim Campbell and Italian Prime Minister Carlo Azeglio Ciampi.

Participants
These summit participants are the current "core members" of the international forum:

Issues
The summit was intended as a venue for resolving differences among its members. As a practical matter, the summit was also conceived as an opportunity for its members to give each other mutual encouragement in the face of difficult economic decisions. Issues which were discussed at this summit included:
 World Economy 
 Trade 
 The Environment 
 Russia and Other Countries in Transition 
 The Developing Countries 
 International Cooperation and Future Summits

Accomplishments
In 1993, the summit leaders called for an "international agreement" to "protect forests," but there is little evidence of follow-up action.

Gallery

See also
 G8

Notes

References
 Bayne, Nicholas and Robert D. Putnam. (2000).  Hanging in There: The G7 and G8 Summit in Maturity and Renewal. Aldershot, Hampshire, England: Ashgate Publishing. ; OCLC 43186692
 Reinalda, Bob and Bertjan Verbeek. (1998).  Autonomous Policy Making by International Organizations. London: Routledge.  ; ;

External links
 No official website is created for any G7 summit prior to 1995 -- see the 21st G7 summit.
 University of Toronto: G8 Research Group, G8 Information Centre
  G7 1993, delegations & documents

G7 summit
1993 in international relations
G7 summit
1993 in Tokyo
G7 summit 1993
G7 summit 1993
1993
History of Tokyo
July 1993 events in Asia